Indrek Simm (born 8 September 1973) is an Estonian film and television director.

He is working at film production company Eetriüksus OÜ.

Filmography
 1997 "Waba Riik"  (television series; director)
 2009 "Kummikaru" (documental film; director)
 2010 "Pilvede all"  (television series; director)
 2011 "Rakett69" (television series; director)
 2013 "Kartulid ja apelsinid"  (television series; director)
 2015 "Üheotsapilet"  (television series; director)
 2016 "Kellapid"  (television series; director)
 2018 "Lõks"  (television series; director)

References

Living people
1973 births
Estonian film directors